96 km is a rural locality (a passing loop) in Lukoshkinskoye Rural Settlement of Topkinsky District, Russia. The population was 4 as of 2010.

Streets 
 1st Lineinaya
 2nd Lineinaya
 3rd Lineinaya
 4th Lineinaya
 5th Lineinaya
 6th Lineinaya
 Zheleznodorozhnaya

Geography 
96 km is located 22 km southwest of Topki (the district's administrative centre) by road. Topki is the nearest rural locality.

References 

Rural localities in Kemerovo Oblast